Dermer is a surname. Notable people with the surname include:

 Bob Dermer (born 1946), Canadian actor
 Ed Dermer (born 1957), Australian politician
 Lawrence Dermer, record producer
 Richard Dermer (1939–2014), restaurateur
 Ron Dermer (born 1971), political consultant
 Thomas Dermer (1590–1620), navigator and explorer